The 1951 World Chess Championship was played between Mikhail Botvinnik and David Bronstein in Moscow from March 15 to May 11, 1951. It was the first match played under the supervision of FIDE; and the first to use a qualifying system of an Interzonal and Candidates Tournament to choose a challenger - a system which stayed in place until 1993.

Botvinnik was the defending champion: he was 39 years old, had been a world leading player in the 1930s and World Champion since 1948. The challenger, David Bronstein, was 27 years old and relatively new to top level competition.

The match ended in a 12-12 tie (5 wins each, and 14 draws), meaning Botvinnik retained the title of World Champion. Writing in 1973, Israel Horowitz described the match as "perhaps the most interesting match ever played for the world championship".

1948 Interzonal tournament

An interzonal tournament was held at Saltsjöbaden in Stockholm, Sweden, in July and August 1948. The top eight finishers qualified for the Candidates tournament.

{| class="wikitable"
|+ 1948 Interzonal Tournament
|-
!  !! !! 1 !! 2 !! 3 !! 4 !! 5 !! 6 !! 7 !! 8 !! 9 !! 10 !! 11 !! 12 !! 13 !! 14 !! 15 !! 16 !! 17 !! 18 !! 19 !! 20 !! Total
|- style="background:#ccffcc;"
| 1 || align=left| || x || 1 || ½ || 1 || ½ || ½ || ½ || ½ || ½ || ½ || 1 || ½ || ½ || 1 || ½ || 1 || ½ || 1 || 1 || 1 || 13½
|- style="background:#ccffcc;"
| 2 || align=left| || 0 || x || ½ || ½ || 1 || ½ || 1 || ½ || ½ || 1 || ½ || 1 || 1 || 1 || ½ || 1 || ½ || ½ || 1 || 0 || 12½ 
|- style="background:#ccffcc;"
| 3 || align=left| || ½ || ½ || x || ½ || ½ || ½ || 0 || 1 || ½ || 1 || ½ || ½ || 1 || ½ || ½ || ½ || 1 || 1 || 1 || ½ || 12 
|- style="background:#ccffcc;"
| 4 || align=left| || 0 || ½ || ½ || x || ½ || ½ || ½ || ½ || ½ || ½ || 1 || ½ || ½ || ½ || ½ || 1 || 1 || 1 || 1 || ½ || 11½ 
|- style="background:#ccffcc;"
| 5 || align=left| || ½ || 0 || ½ || ½ || x || 1 || 1 || ½ || ½ || ½ || 0 || ½ || ½ || ½ || 1 || ½ || 1 || ½ || ½ || 1 || 11 
|-
| 6 || align=left| || ½ || ½ || ½ || ½ || 0 || x || ½ || ½ || 1 || 0 || ½ || 1 || ½ || 0 || ½ || ½ || 1 || ½ || 1 || 1 || 10½
|- style="background:#ccffcc;"
| 7 || align=left| || ½ || 0 || 1 || ½ || 0 || ½ || x || ½ || ½ || 1 || 0 || 1 || ½ || 0 || ½ || 1 || ½ || ½ || 1 || 1 || 10½
|- style="background:#ccffcc;"
| 8 || align=left| || ½ || ½ || 0 || ½ || ½ || ½ || ½ || x || ½ || 0 || ½ || 1 || 1 || ½ || ½ || ½ || ½ || 1 || ½ || 1 || 10½
|- style="background:#ccffcc;"
| 9 || align=left| || ½ || ½ || ½ || ½ || ½ || 0 || ½ || ½ || x || ½ || ½ || ½ || ½ || ½ || ½ || ½ || 1 || ½ || 1 || 1 || 10½ 
|-
| 10 || align=left| || ½ || 0 || 0 || ½ || ½ || 1 || 0 || 1 || ½ || x || ½ || ½ || 0 || 1 || ½ || ½ || 1 || ½ || 1 || ½ || 10 
|-
| 11 || align=left| || 0 || ½ || ½ || 0 || 1 || ½ || 1 || ½ || ½ || ½ || x || ½ || ½ || 0 || 1 || 0 || ½ || 1 || ½ || ½ || 9½ 
|-
| 12 || align=left| || ½ || 0 || ½ || ½ || ½ || 0 || 0 || 0 || ½ || ½ || ½ || x || 1 || ½ || 1 || 1 || 1 || ½ || 0 || 1 || 9½ 
|-
| 13 || align=left| || ½ || 0 || 0 || ½ || ½ || ½ || ½ || 0 || ½ || 1 || ½ || 0 || x || ½ || ½ || ½ || ½ || 1 || 1 || 1 || 9½ 
|-
| 14 || align=left| || 0 || 0 || ½ || ½ || ½ || 1 || 1 || ½ || ½ || 0 || 1 || ½ || ½ || x || 0 || 0 || ½ || 0 || ½ || 1 || 8½ 
|-
| 15 || align=left| || ½ || ½ || ½ || ½ || 0 || ½ || ½ || ½ || ½ || ½ || 0 || 0 || ½ || 1 || x || 0 || ½ || ½ || ½ || 1 || 8½ 
|-
| 16 || align=left| || 0 || 0 || ½ || 0 || ½ || ½ || 0 || ½ || ½ || ½ || 1 || 0 || ½ || 1 || 1 || x || 0 || ½ || ½ || ½ || 8  
|-
| 17 || align=left| || ½ || ½ || 0 || 0 || 0 || 0 || ½ || ½ || 0 || 0 || ½ || 0 || ½ || ½ || ½ || 1 || x || 1 || ½ || 1 || 7½ 
|-
| 18 || align=left| || 0 || ½ || 0 || 0 || ½ || ½ || ½ || 0 || ½ || ½ || 0 || ½ || 0 || 1 || ½ || ½ || 0 || x || ½ || ½ || 6½ 
|-
| 19 || align=left| || 0 || 0 || 0 || 0 || ½ || 0 || 0 || ½ || 0 || 0 || ½ || 1 || 0 || ½ || ½ || ½ || ½ || ½ || x || ½ || 5½  
|-
| 20 || align=left| || 0 || 1 || ½ || ½ || 0 || 0 || 0 || 0 || 0 || ½ || ½ || 0 || 0 || 0 || 0 || ½ || 0 || ½ ||½ || x ||4½ 
|}

The four players tied for sixth place were to have played off for three spots in the Candidates tournament, but Bondarevsky had to withdraw due to illness, so the other three qualified automatically.

1950 Candidates tournament

The 1950 Candidates tournament was held in Budapest, Hungary in April and May 1950. The players who finished second through fifth in the 1948 championship tournament (Smyslov, Keres, Reshevsky, and Euwe) were seeded directly into the tournament, along with Reuben Fine, who had been invited to the 1948 tournament but declined, and the top eight finishers from the Interzonal.

It has been written that the two American players, Reshevsky and Fine, were prevented from travelling to Hungary by the US State Department, with travel restrictions due to the Cold War; However, Reshevsky said in 1991 that he could have gone but did not want to. Euwe declined due to work commitments, and Bondarevsky due to illness.

{| class="wikitable" style="text-align: center;"
|+ 1950 Candidates Tournament
|-
! !! !! 1 !! 2 !! 3 !! 4 !! 5 !! 6 !! 7 !! 8 !! 9 !! 10 !! Score 
|- style="background:#ccffcc;"
| 1  || align=left| || xx || = = || 0 1 || = 1 || 1 1 || 1 = || 0 1 || = = || 1 = || = 1 || 12 
|- style="background:#ccffcc;"
| 2  || align=left| || = = || xx || 1 = || = = || = = || 1 = || = = || = 1 || = 1 || 1 1 || 12
|-
| 3  || align=left| || 1 0 || 0 = || xx || = = || 1 = || = 1 || 0 1 || = 1 || = = || = = || 10 
|-
| 4  || align=left| || = 0 || = = || = = || xx || = = || 1 0 || 1 = || = = || = 1 || = = || 9½ 
|-
| 5  || align=left| || 0 0 || = = || 0 = || = = || xx || = = || = = || 1 1 || = 1 || = = || 9 
|-
| 6  || align=left| || 0 = || 0 = || = 0 || 0 1 || = = || xx || = 1 || 1 0 || 1 0 || 1 = || 8½ 
|-
| 7  || align=left|     || 1 0 || = = || 1 0 || 0 = || = = || = 0 || xx || = = || = = || = = || 8 
|-
| 8  || align=left| || = = || = 0 || = 0 || = = || 0 0 || 0 1 || = = || xx || 1 0 || = = || 7 
|-
| 9  || align=left| || 0 = || = 0 || = = || = 0 || = 0 || 0 1 || = = || 0 1 || xx || 1 0 || 7 
|-
| 10 || align=left| || = 0 || 0 0 || = = || = = || = = || 0 = || = = || = = || 0 1 || xx || 7 
|}

The co-winners then played a 12-game rematch in Moscow in July and August 1950. In the event of another tie, the first decisive game would determine Botvinnik's challenger for the title.

Bronstein thus earned the right to challenge the reigning champion.

Boleslavsky's strategy
Going into the final round of the Candidates tournament, Boleslavsky had a half point lead over Bronstein. Boleslavsky had white against Stahlberg, and offered a short draw when he was in a good position, which Stahlberg accepted. This gave Bronstein the opportunity to catch him, which he did, with a brilliant win against Keres. It has been said, by both Bronstein and by Yuri Averbakh, that Boleslavsky allowed Bronstein to catch him. Averbakh said that Boleslavsky had a very poor record against Botvinnik, and hoped that a tie would mean a 3-way match between Botvinnik, Boleslavsky and Bronstein, although this did not eventuate.

It has also been speculated that the result of the Bronstein-Boleslavsky match was pre-arranged by the contestants.

1951 Championship match

Conditions
The match was played as best of 24 games. If it ended 12-12, Botvinnik, the holder, would retain the Championship.

Match

Botvinnik retained the championship.

Highlights

External links
1951 World Chess Championship at the Internet Archive record of Graeme Cree's Chess Pages

References

1951
1951 in chess
1951 in Soviet sport
1951 in Moscow